Hungarian pengő coins were part of the physical form of Hungary's historical currency, the Hungarian pengő. Initially, higher value coins were made of silver to reflect value and stability. Later, during the second world war, these coins were replaced first by banknotes and later by aluminium coins. By the end of 1945, pengő coins completely lost their value due to rampant inflation.

Prewar series (1926-1940)

Before World War II, the fillér and pengő coins were made of bronze (1 and 2 f), cupronickel (10-, 20-, and 50 f), and 640 ‰ fine silver (1-, 2-, and 5 P). Commemorative 2 and 5 pengő coins were issued on anniversaries in large quantities (hundreds of thousands) and were released into circulation. The coins had a Baroque style; the most important designers were János Pálinkás, Lajos Berán, and József Reményi.

Although pengő was based on a gold standard, and the quality standards of gold coins (10 and 20 pengő) were enacted, no gold coins were released into circulation due to the Great Depression.

War series (1940-1944)

As a consequence of the war, the government recalled the silver pengő coins (deadline: 31 January 1942) to prevent personal hoarding. These were replaced by newly designed aluminium coins. Later the cupronickel 10, 20 and 50 fillér coins were recalled as well, moreover, even the bronze 1 and 2 fillér coins disappeared after a time. First, they were replaced by steel, later - in the case of the 2 fillér - with zinc coins. The war coins were redesigned by Lajos Berán. As the war escalated, none of the above metals was cheap enough to mint coins. The solution was the issuing of low denomination paper money (see there).

Postwar series (1945)

Only an aluminium 5-pengő-coin was minted under the postwar government. Due to the rampant inflation, all coins were withdrawn from circulation by the end of 1945.

Source:
  www.numismatics.hu
  www.penzportal.hu

Remarks
 "MAGYAR KIRÁLYSÁG" = "Kingdom of Hungary"
 "MAGYARORSZÁG VÉDASSZONYA" = "Patroness of Hungary"
 "VITÉZ NAGYBÁNYAI HORTHY MIKLÓS MAGYARORSZÁG KORMÁNYZÓJA" = "Vitéz Miklós Horthy de Nagybánya, Regent of Hungary"
 "A 300 ÉVES KIR PÁZMÁNY PÉTER TUD EGYETEM ALAPÍTÁSÁNAK EMLÉKÉRE" = "Anniversary of the establishment of the 300-year-old Péter Pázmány University of Sciences"
 "LISZT FERENC A NAGY MAGYAR ZENEKÖLTŐ EMLÉKÉRE" = "To the memory of Franz Liszt, the great Hungarian composer"
 "VITÉZ NAGYBÁNYAI HORTHY MIKLÓS KORMÁNYZÓSÁGÁNAK 10 ÉVFORDULÓJÁRA" = "To the 10th anniversary of the regency of Vitéz Miklós Horthy de Nagybánya"
 "VITÉZ NAGYBÁNYAI HORTHY MIKLÓS MAGYARORSZÁG KORMÁNYZÓJA SZÜLETÉSÉNEK 75 ÉVFORDULÓJÁRA" = "To the 75th anniversary of the birth of Vitéz Miklós Horthy de Nagybánya, Regent of Hungary"
 "MAGYAR ÁLLAMI VÁLTÓPÉNZ" = "Hungarian state (or treasury) change money"

References

Hungarian pengo
pengő